The Soyer-Barritault SB1 was a home-built 2-seat tourism aircraft built in France in the early 1980s.

Specifications

References

1980s French aircraft